The Verlag Theodor Steinkopff was a German publishing company based in Dresden, Germany, that specialised in medical and scientific books and periodicals.

Founded by publisher Theodor Steinkopff on 1 January 1908 in Dresden, the Verlag Theodor Steinkopff put a strong focus on publications on colloid chemistry. Among its earliest publications was the Zeitschrift für Chemie und Industrie der Kolloide, today known as Colloid and Polymer Science.

In 1927, Theodor Steinkopff's son Dietrich Steinkopff entered the company, which was based in the Residenzstraße 32 in the Dresden borough of Blasewitz and had branch offices in Leipzig and Darmstadt. While the Verlag Theodor Steinkopff itself became defunct in 1978, its branch office in Darmstadt became an independent company simply named the Steinkopff Verlag. It continued to exist until 1980, when it was taken over by Springer Verlag (now Springer Science+Business Media).

Further reading 

Academic publishing companies
Book publishing companies of Germany
Publishing companies of Germany
Publishing companies established in 1908
Publishing companies disestablished in 1978
Defunct publishing companies
1908 establishments in Germany
1978 disestablishments in Germany
Mass media in Dresden